Gheorghe Langa (10 January 1930 – 5 August 1968) was a Romanian equestrian. He competed at the 1956 Summer Olympics and the 1960 Summer Olympics.

He was killed in a motor vehicle accident, alongside fellow Romanian equestrian Mihai Timu.

References

External links
 

1930 births
1968 deaths
Romanian male equestrians
Olympic equestrians of Romania
Equestrians at the 1956 Summer Olympics
Equestrians at the 1960 Summer Olympics
People from Brașov County